Frenship (stylized FRENSHIP) is an American pop duo, consisting of James Sunderland and Brett Hite. They are best known for their 2016 single, "Capsize".

Career
Sunderland and Hite met while working at the fitness store Lululemon and became fans of each other's music; this led to them creating music together. The duo first posted to SoundCloud the song "Knives", which was produced alongside Norwegian producer Matoma. The track gained popularity online which led the duo to upload a second track, "Nowhere", followed by "Carpet".

In June 2016, the duo released "Capsize", a collaboration with American singer and songwriter Emily Warren, charting in multiple countries. The song also reached number one on Hype Machine, and has surpassed 505 million streams on Spotify. Their follow up single "1000 Nights" has over 45 million streams on Spotify to date, and continues to grow at Alternative Radio. Frenship released their debut EP, Truce, in September 2016 via Columbia Records.

Their debut album, Vacation, was released on 17 May 2019.

On September 10, 2021, the duo released the single "All My Friends". The song recounts their experience during the COVID-19 pandemic.

Discography

Albums

EPs

Singles

References

External links

 FRENSHIP on Facebook

American electronic music duos
Male musical duos
Musical groups from Los Angeles
Electropop groups
Counter Records artists
Columbia Records artists
Ninja Tune artists